Scott Wright is an English actor, singer and musician. He was nominated for a National Television Award in 2001 for Most Popular Newcomer for his role as Sam Kingston in Coronation Street.

Career
Wright had a three-year stay in ITV's Coronation Street, playing Sam Kingston. Wright's other acting credits on television include ITV's Crossroads and BBC One's Casualty. Added to this he played the title role in Tristan in the Merlin International films production.  Wright has also appeared in ITV's Emmerdale and Channel 4's Shameless and ITV1’s Midwinter of the Spirit, playing Anna Maxwell Martins’ husband Sean Watkins. It also starred David Threlfall. In 2016 Wright played Jordan Dawkins in a national tour of The Shawshank Redemption for Bill Kenwright. It was reported in 2018 Wright was filming a television pilot called Two Wolves also starring Sir Derek Jacobi, James Cosmo and Emmy award winning American actress Dove Cameron. In November 2020, he appeared in an episode of the BBC soap opera Doctors as Scott Keane.

As a musician Wright has worked with numerous international multimillion selling artists including Alexander O Neil, Martha Reaves, David Cassidy, Candi Staton and Jordan Knight.

In 2002 Wright was awarded the title of Rear of the Year with singer Charlotte Church.

In 2023 Wright produced and took the Title role in feature film The Stoic alongside Jason Flemyng (Snatch,The Curious Case of Benjamin Button)and Bruce Payne (Passenger 57, Dungeons and Dragons)

Filmography

Television

Theatre

Film

Presenting

References

External links
 

Living people
English male television actors
People from Ashton-under-Lyne
Actors from Lancashire
Year of birth missing (living people)